Spiralisigna subpumilata is a moth in the family Geometridae. It is found in mainland Japan, the Ryukyu Islands, Hong Kong, as well as Taiwan and Russia.

References

Moths described in 1972
Eupitheciini
Moths of Japan